Jasem Adel Al-Hail (Arabic:جاسم عادل الهيل) (born 29 January 1992) is a Qatari footballer. He currently plays for Al Arabi.

References

External links
 

Qatari footballers
1992 births
Living people
Al-Markhiya SC players
Al-Shahania SC players
Qatar SC players
Al-Arabi SC (Qatar) players
Qatar Stars League players
Qatari Second Division players
Association football goalkeepers
Place of birth missing (living people)